Lucienne Malovry (born 11 April 1931) is a member of the Senate of France, representing the Val-d'Oise department.  She is a member of the Union for a Popular Movement.

References
Page on the Senate website

1931 births
Living people
Union for a Popular Movement politicians
French Senators of the Fifth Republic
Women members of the Senate (France)
21st-century French women politicians
Senators of Val-d'Oise